Gaoping is a county-level city in the southeast of Shanxi Province, China, under the administration of the prefecture-level city of Jincheng. It has a history stretching back to the Warring States period (403–221 BCE). Part of the city was formerly known as Changping where a noted battle took place in 260 BCE between forces from the rival States of Qin and Zhao.

Gaoping is also famed as the birthplace of Lord Yan, a legendary figure who was an early leader (or series of leaders) among the ancient Han Chinese.

Gaoping (along with several other locations in China) was traditionally identified as Yan's hometown.  Not until the late 20th and early 21st century was Gaoping widely accepted as Yan's birthplace by the global scholarly community.

The hilly area around Gaoping is known as the Sheep's Head Mountains, and it is this area that preserves the most concrete evidences of Yan's habitation there.  A local temple to a female river spirit has been identified as portraying Yan's daughter Nüwa - not to be confused with the goddess Nüwa - since the Ming Dynasty.  Ancient sources, such as the Guo Yu, record that Yan and his posterity flourished in the area around a river called the "Giang [Jiang] Water".  The river is believed by scholars to be the Giang River of old is now called the Jiang River or the Jiang Water, and is located in Tunliu County, whence it flows east into the Zhang River.

Climate

References

Yan Di Wen Hua 炎帝文化, edited by Wang Shuxin 王树新 and Meng Shikai 孟世凯.  Zhonghua Bookstore (Beijing): 2005.

Cities in Shanxi
County-level divisions of Shanxi